Typhoon Hester was a severe typhoon that formed in the 1952 Pacific typhoon season and continued into January 1953. As the twenty-ninth storm and twentieth typhoon of the season, it was first tracked by Joint Typhoon Warning Center (JTWC) near the Marshall Islands as a tropical storm on December 27. Hester quickly became a typhoon and rapidly intensified. Near the end of the year, Hester became a Category 5 typhoon on the modern-day Saffir–Simpson hurricane wind scale south of Guam. The typhoon soon weakened quickly as it curved eastward and sped up. It weakened into a tropical storm on January 4, and JTWC ceased tracking it hours later.

In preparations for the storm, shelters were opened in Guam, and all government buildings and businesses were closed. In Marshall Islands, Enewetak experienced significant flooding, and buildings were damaged by the wind. Eighteen people were injured on the island. In Guam, the only damages reported were destroyed crops due to waves and washed out roads. There were no fatalities caused by the storm.

Meteorological history

Hester was first tracked by the JTWC and the Japan Meteorological Agency (JMA) at 1800 UTC of December 27, 1952. The storm began to rapidly intensify, as it moved north of the Caroline Islands. It soon peaked in intensity on the next day at 1200 UTC, just south of the Mariana Islands. The storm had winds at 185 mph (295 km/h) and began to turn northwest.

Hester began to curve eastward and weaken rapidly. It soon became a tropical storm on January 4, and soon dropped to a tropical depression later that day. JTWC ceased tracking the storm near Minami-Tori-shima. JMA downgraded the system to a tropical depression at 1200 UTC of January 5, and declared it extratropical twelve hours later. At 0600 UTC of January 6, JMA stopped tracking the cyclone northeast of Wake Island.

Preparations and impact

In Guam, underground shelters were open to residents, and hospitals were evacuated by December 31. All government offices and businesses were closed on the island. Roadblocks were placed by the police to keep vehicles off the road. A gale alert was issued for the Mariana Islands. Due to the storm, a Pan American flight flew directly from Wake Island to Manila instead of stopping at Guam. Four days later, shipping was warned for the area southeast of Formosa, as Hester approached the area.

There were no direct reports on the island, where it was mostly underwater when the storm passed it. The hospital, mess halls, and clubs were damaged by the winds. Tents on the island were also destroyed. A Coast Guard LORAN station on the island suffered extensive damage. Overall, eighteen people were injured on Enewetak, and there were no fatalities. The nearby atoll of Ujelang, received stronger winds than Enewetak, as it was closer to the center of Hester. The only damage reported were crops being lashed by the waves on the south side of the island, and a new section of highway near Ylig River was washed away. Two shore wave recorders installed by the University of California, Berkeley, located in Tarague Beach and Ylig River, were destroyed. There were no casualties on the island.

See also

Typhoon Olive (1952)
Typhoon Keith
Typhoon Joan (1997)

References

Further reading

Hester
Hester
December 1952 events in Oceania
January 1953 events in Oceania
Typhoons in Guam
Typhoons in the Marshall Islands